Mount Huffman is a prominent mountain  northeast of Mount Abrams, in the Behrendt Mountains of Ellsworth Land, Antarctica. It was mapped by the United States Geological Survey from surveys and U.S. Navy air photos from 1961 to 1967, and was named by the Advisory Committee on Antarctic Names for Jerry W. Huffman, a scientific leader at Eights Station in 1963.

See also
 Mountains in Antarctica

References

Mountains of Ellsworth Land